Stephan Vanfleteren (born 1969) is a Belgian photographer, best known for his portraits in black and white and his depictions of Belgium and abroad.

Biography 
Stephan Vanfleteren was born in Kortrijk in 1969, and was brought up in Oostduinkerke. He studied photography at the Institut Saint-Luc in Brussels from 1988 to 1992.

In 1993, while awaiting military service, he made a trip to New York, where he mostly did street photography. He has described New York as his "entrance ticket" to the profession of photography.

Career 
Vanfleteren started out as primarily a photojournalist for the newspaper De Morgen. He also found time for stories far from the headlines, such as the experience of riding boxcars in the American northwest.

He has also contributed to The Guardian, Humo, Independent Magazine, Knack, Le Monde, Paris Match, de Volkskrant, and Die Zeit.

Co-founder of the publishing company Uitgeverij Kannibaal/Hannibal, he is also its artistic director. Since 2010, he has been a visiting professor at the Royal Academy of Fine Arts in Ghent.

Elvis&Presley 
In May 1999, Vanfleteren travelled around the USA with his friend the Swiss photographer , in the footsteps of their idol Elvis Presley. They photographed each other, "in identical white jumpsuits, mirror shades and high-rise hair", as "Elvis" (Huber) and "Presley" (Vanfleteren), in humdrum scenes from Times Square to Death Valley. Vanfleteren photographed in black and white, Huber in colour. This led to Vanfleteren's first major book and an exhibition. Both photographers, said a reviewer of the exhibition at the Open Eye Gallery, showed themselves to "have a fine eye for ironic composition".

From reportage to portraiture 
Vanfleteren's portraits have been his best-known and most recognizable work. Always in black and white, he has photographed many people from the art world but also many who are unknown. A review in Het Nieuwsblad of an exhibition of his portraits commented that Vanfleteren's proximity to the faces and the detail of the photographs together almost create "death masks of the living".

As an international project, Vanfleteren has given faces to numerous people living in poverty and isolation in Antwerp and Brussels. "While I focused on their eyes, I listened to their experiences." In 2009 these portraits, along with others, became the subject of an exhibition at Le Botanique, a cultural centre in Brussels. Most were taken with one of Vanfleteren's four Rolleiflexes, as their waist-level finders allowed him to get close.

The exhibition then went on tour.

In 2018, he published Surf Tribe, for which he had made a months-long journey around the world, making portraits of surfers. He went to the most celebrated beaches for surfing, but also little-known places in order to portray the most famous surfers, champions as well as unknown amateurs. He did not photograph them in motion but instead captured their static portraits on the beach.

Belgicum 
From September 2007 to February 2008, the exhibition Belgicum was held at Fotomuseum Antwerp (FoMu). A review in La Libre described this:

Dilapidated buildings, outdated town fairs, unfashionable bars [. . .]. Series of portraits – one could call them mugs – of persons bearing the scars of their hard lives, landscapes engulfed in mist, a document of the repetitive days of an internee at the Guislain Institute in Ghent and finally an un-embellished portrayal of Theofiel, an old farmer broken down amid a pile of objects. This is all "Belgicum"; and obviously, as the [book of the same title] also shows, this tragic Belgium of the little people between canals and side-roads is in fact that of a true Simenon of photography.Bâtisses délabrées, kermesses ringardes, bistrots borgnes, des ambiances qui se prolongent dans sept suites d'images installées en grand tout autour du reste de la salle. Séries de portraits – de gueules plus exactement – d'écorchés de la vie dure, paysages tous noyés dans la brume, constat des journées répétitives d'un interné de l'institut Guislain à Gand et enfin description au couteau de Theofiel, un vieux fermier cassé au milieu de son capharnaüm. C'est tout cela "Belgicum" et de toute évidence, comme le laisse voir également le très bel album éponyme, cette Belgique tragique des petites gens entre canal et trajectoires obliques est en fait celle d'un véritable Simenon de la photo.

Charleroi 
He produced a series of photographs, including many portraits, taken in that city, which had been greatly affected by deindustrialization. These were exhibited in the museum in 2015. The exhibition was described on RTBF as "a tender look at a harsh reality", and as having links to the work of August Sander and Walker Evans yet being the product of a singular vision. A review in Moustique said:

Alone, free as a dog, sidling between fog and neon lights, in streets where memories of once flourishing industry disintegrate, or contemplating from the top of a slag heap a landscape where factories once spewed smoke, it is above all all the decay of the world that he encounters.Seul, libre comme un chien, se faufilant entre brouillard et néons, dans des rues où s’écroulent les souvenirs d’une industrie autrefois florissante, ou contemplant du haut d’un terril un paysage où les usines vomissaient autrefois des nuages de fumée, c’est surtout toute la décrépitude du monde qu’il croise.

Façades & Vitrines 
With rare exceptions, Vanfleteren has only photographed in black and white. However, in 2013 he published a series of colour photographs, taken several years earlier, of old wall advertisements, facades destined for demolition or abandoned shop windows; these appeared in a lavishly produced book, Façades & Vitrines.

Stil leven 
Rejecting the museum's initial request for photographs of the Atlantic Wall, he let himself be influenced by the environment of the museum and the surrounding park to realize a series of nudes, still lifes with dead animals, in both black and white and colour. His photos form a dialogue with the work of the painter Armando, the building, and the surrounding nature.

Present 
In 2020, Fotomuseum Antwerp organized a major retrospective, Present, which followed Vanfleteren's thirty years of photography, with personal reflections: from street photography in cities such as New York to the Rwandan genocide, from store facades to the "darkly beautiful" remains of the Atlantic Wall, from still lifes to portraits.

Awards 
World Press Photo awards
1996 Photo Contest: Sports, Stories, 3rd prize
1997 Photo Contest: Daily Life, Stories, 1st prize
1997 Photo Contest: People in the News, Stories, 2nd prize
2001 Photo Contest: Children's Award, Singles, Individual awards
2001 Photo Contest: Arts and Entertainment, Stories, 3rd prize
2013 Photo Contest: Staged Portraits, Stories, 1st prize
 European Fuji Award, 1998
  2009
  2011
Nationale Portretprijs (Netherlands) 2012; for a portrait of Rem Koolhaas
Culture Prize of the Province of West Flanders  2013
 Honorary doctorate at the Vrije Universiteit Brussel in August 2021, together with the photographer Dirk Braeckman

Exhibitions

Solo and pair exhibitions
Elvis&Presley. Accompanied by a book.
, Verona, 2001.
Open Eye Gallery, Liverpool, December 2001 – January 2002.
Photographie am Schiffsbauerdamm (FAS), Berlin, 2002.
 Belgicum. Accompanied by a book.
FotoMuseum Provincie Antwerpen. September 2007 – January 2008.
Flanders Center, Osaka. February–March 2008.
Le Botanique (Centre Culturel de la Fédération Wallonie-Bruxelles), Brussels. June–August 2009.
Galerie Hilaneh von Kories, Hamburg. November 2011 – March 2012.
ImageSingulières, Sète, France. May–June 2012.
Galerie Hilaneh von Kories, Hamburg. January–April 2015.
 Portret 1989–2009. Accompanied by a book.
, Ghent, September–December 2009.
, Maastricht, April–June 2010. Accessed 5 August 2020.
, Genk, Belgium, December 2010 – February 2011.
 Flandrien. (At some venues, with cycling-related poems by Hugo Claus, Herman Gorter, Gerrit Komrij, Tom Lanoye, Dimitri Verhulst and others, curated by Louis De Pelsmaeker.) Accompanied by a book.
Flandrien: Hard Men and Heroes. Host Gallery (Honduras Street Gallery), London. June–July 2007.
Flandrien. , Amsterdam. April 2010.
WielerSportCultuur. Netherlands Photo Museum, Rotterdam. June–August 2010.
WielerSportCultuur. KU Leuven library. September–October 2010.
Flanders Center, Osaka. March 2013.
Flanders Center, Osaka. June 2013.
 Flakkelân. Fries Museum, Leeuwarden, Netherlands, June–August 2010.
Photography #1. De Tijd Hervonden, Hasselt, Belgium, February–April 2011. Successively: portraits, from Belgicum, and from Elvis&Presley.
En avant, marche, Huis van Alijn, Ghent, November 2012 – September 2013. Accompanied by a book.
Façades & Vitrines. Accompanied by a book.
March–June 2013. One of three shows constituting Aller Retour (the others being by Carl De Keyzer, from Moments before the Flood, and by Bieke Depoorter, from her series of people in their homes).
Galerie Hilaneh von Kories, Hamburg. March–June 2014.
Stil Leven: Stephan Vanfleteren & Armando,  (MOA), Bunnik, Netherlands, March–September 2016. An exhibition by Vanfleteren and Armando.
MMXIV: Les Diables / De Duivels. About the "Red Devils", Belgium's soccer team. Accompanied by a book.
Botanique, Brussels. June–August 2014.
C-Mine, Genk, Belgium. June–August 2015.
Atlantic Wall. Photographs of the (German, wartime) "Atlantic Wall". Atlantic Wall Museum, Raversyde, Belgium. June–October 2014.  Accompanied by a book.
Charleroi. Photographs of Charleroi. Musée de la photographie de Charleroi, Belgium. May–December 2015.  Accompanied by a book.
Engelen van de Zee = The angels of the sea. Portraits of pupils of the maritime school Koninklijk Werk IBIS, Bredene.
 (Nationaal Visserijmuseum), Oostduinkerke, Belgium, July–November 2016.
 Het Scheepvaartmuseum, Amsterdam, September 2020 – April 2021. (Previously scheduled June–August 2020.)
Utrecht University, May–July 2016. Accompanied by a book.
The People of Mercy. Maritiem Park, Antwerp, October–November 2017.
Surf Tribe. Accompanied by a book.
, Knokke-Heist, Belgium. March–May 2018. Accompanied by a book.
Kunsthal, Rotterdam, Netherlands. October 2018 – January 2019.
Kahmann Gallery, Amsterdam, Netherlands. January–March 2019.
Liberté! Bordeaux 2019, L'esprit des Lumières, Cour Mably and Musée d'Aquitaine, Bordeaux, France. July–September 2019.
Terre / Mer. Gemeentemuseum Den Haag, The Hague, July–November 2018. Photographs of Walcheren, commissioned by the Gemeentemuseum Den Haag and presented as a supplement to an exhibition of paintings of Walcheren by Jan Toorop, Piet Mondriaan, Jacoba van Heemskerck and Ferdinand Hart Nibbrig.
Onuitgesproken: Michel Van Dousselaere. , Ghent. December 2019 – March 2020. Accompanied by a book.
Present. FoMu Antwerp. October 2019 – September 2020.  Accompanied by a book.
Corona walks. FoMu Antwerp. June–September 2020. Accompanied by a book.

Group exhibitions 
Buren, document Nederland, drie buitenlandse fotografen kijken naar Nederland. Rijksmuseum Amsterdam. November 2000 – February 2001. With  and Mark Power.  Accompanied by a book.
In de marge: Belgische documentaire fotografie = In the Margin: Belgian Documentary Photography = En marge: Photographie documentaire belge. Museum Dr. Guislain, Ghent, Belgium, June–September 2011. Accompanied by a book.
Call the world brother. Aberystwyth Arts Centre, May–July 2012. Panos Pictures exhibition, with work by GMB Akash, Chloe Dewe Mathews, Robin Hammond, Chris Keulen, Andrew McConnell, Martin Roemers, and Vanfleteren.
 Modern Times: Photography in the 20th Century, Rijksmuseum Amsterdam. November 2014 – January 2015. Curated by Mattie Boom and Hans Rooseboom.
Facing Japan. With Marleen Daniëls, Nick Hannes, Maroesjka Lavigne, Tony Le Duc, Charlotte Lybeer, Sarah Van Marcke and Rob Walbers. Museum Dr. Guislain. June–September 2015. Accompanied by a book.
Faces Now: European Portrait Photography since 1990 = Faces Now: Portraits photographiques européens depuis 1990. By 33 photographers. Accompanied by a book.
Bozar, Brussels. February–May 2015.
Netherlands Photo Museum, Rotterdam. June–August 2015.
Thessaloniki Museum of Photography, September 2015 – February 2016.

Collections 

 Rijksmuseum Amsterdam. 102 works (as of 15 August 2021).

Books

By Vanfleteren alone 
Flandrien. A compact photobook showing cyclists and cycling. Accompanied by an exhibition.
Ghent: Merz, 2005. .
Ghent: Medium, 2006. .
[S.l.]: Kannibaal, 2010. .
Belgicum. With an essay, "B", by David Van Reybrouck in Dutch, French, and English. Accompanied by an exhibition.
Tielt: Lannoo, 2007. .
[Lichtervelde]: Hannibal, 2016. .
Oosteroever: Editie #1. Ostend: TarTarT, 2007. .
Portret, 1989–2009. Tielt: Lannoo, 2009. . Accompanied by an exhibition.
The Last Post. [Lichtervelde]: Hannibal, 2013. . Thirty-two postcards and a book.
Façades & vitrines. [Lichtervelde]: Hannibal, 2013. Text in Dutch and French. . Accompanied by an exhibition.
MMXIV – Les Diables / De Rode Duivels. [Lichtervelde]: Cannibal, 2014. . Photographs of the Belgium national football team. Accompanied by an exhibition.
Atlantic Wall. [Veurne]: Hannibal, 2015. Accompanied by an exhibition.
 Text in Dutch and English. .
 Text in French and English. .
Charleroi: Il est clair que le gris est noir. [Veurne]: Hannibal, 2015. Text in Dutch and French. . Accompanied by an exhibition.
Surf Tribe. [Veurne]: Hannibal, 2019. Accompanied by an exhibition.
Dutch-language edition. .
English-language edition. .
Present. [Veurne]: Hannibal, 2019. Accompanied by an exhibition.
Dutch-language edition. .
English-language edition. .
Dagboek van een Fotograaf: Coronawandelingen. Amsterdam: De Bezige Bij, 2020. . Accompanied by an exhibition.

In collaboration 
Giganten van Afrika: De hoge vlucht van Nigeria's Super Eagles. By Jan Antonissen, Vincent Loozen, and Vanfleteren. Leuven: Van Halewyck, 1998. .
Buren, document Nederland, drie buitenlandse fotografen kijken naar Nederland = Neighbours: The Netherlands as seen by three foreign photographers. Amsterdam: De Verbeelding, 2000. . Accompanied by an exhibition.
Hans Vandekerckhove: schilderijen ter vervolmaking van methoden van onbeweeglijkheid. Otegem: Deweer Art Gallery, 2001. Accompanying an exhibition, March–April 2001. Photographs of Hans Vandekerckhove by Vanfleteren and Peter Claeys. .
Elvis&Presley. With . Accompanied by an exhibition.
Hamburg: Kruse, 2000. .
Veurne: Cannibal, 2016. .
Tales from a Globalizing world. Edited by Daniel Schwartz; with Philip Jones Griffiths, Zijah Gafić, Shehzad Noorani, Tim Hetherington, Bertien van Manen, . London: Thames & Hudson, 2003. .
Koers! Het rijke Vlaamse wielerleven in twaalf portretten. Text by Jeroen de Preter and Tony Landuyt; photographs by Vanfleteren. Amsterdam: Meulenhoff; Antwerp: Manteau, 2003. .
Verfraaiing: 12 werken uit de provinciale kunstcollectie, 12 creaties, 24 kunstenaarsportretten. Edited by Wendy Leplae and Chris Minten; photographs by Vanfleteren. Bruges: Provincie West-Vlaanderen, 2005. .
Kinderen van de weg. Hasselt, Amsterdam: Clavis, 2006. .
Het beste moet nog komen. Leuven: Van Halewyck, 2006. .
Observatorium. ; with contributions by Paul DePondt, Wim Van Mulders, Peter Verhelst; photography by Mirjam Devriendt and Vanfleteren. Ghent: Ludion, 2008. .
"Tot ziens!" Vanfleteren contributes photographs to this book and DVD set. Leuven: Davidsfonds/Infodok, 2008. .
Schrijvers gaan niet dood. Amsterdam: Atlas, 2008. .
De dingen der helaasheid: over de verfilming van 'De helaasheid der dingen' van Dimitri Verhulst. By Dimitri Verhulst and Felix van Groeningen; photographs by Vanfleteren. Tielt: Lannoo, 2009. .
WielerSportCultuur.
Merckxissimo. About the cyclist Eddy Merckx.
Karl Vannieuwkerke. Renner willen worden. Lichtervelde: Kannibaal 2010. . A memoir by the sports reporter Karl Vannieuwkerke. Vanfleteren contributes photographs.
Karl Dhont, and Vanfleteren. Stam N° 3: leven voor blauw-zwart. Lichtervelde: Kannibaal, 2011. . About the fans of Club Brugge. Vanfleteren contributes photographs.
 and Anna Luyten. De erfenis van Briek. Lichtervelde: Kannibaal, 2011. . About the cyclist Briek Schotte. Vanfleteren contributes photographs.
Aller/Retour: De grenzen van Fort Europa. With Michael de Cock. Ghent: Ludion, 2010. .
Futur Simple: De kinderen van Congo. With Koen Vidal. Ghent: Ludion, 2010. .
Bobbejaan. By Tom Schoepen, with photography by Bobbejaan Records,  and Vanfleteren. [Lichtervelde]: Kannibaal, 2011. . About the musician Bobbejaan Schoepen.
De Ronde: Een Zondag in April. Photographs by Vanfleteren. [Lichtervelde]: Hannibal, 2011. . About the television series .
In de marge: Belgische documentaire fotografie = In the Margin: Belgian Documentary Photography = En marge: photographie documentaire belge. Ghent: Museum Dr. Guislain; Tielt: Lannoo, 2011. . With numerous other photographers. Accompanied by an exhibition.
Frederic Backelandt, and Vanfleteren. Fausto Coppi. Lichtervelde: Kannibaal, 2012. . About the cyclist Fausto Coppi.
Merckx 525. By Frederik Backelandt, Ron Reuman, Jan Maes, and Vanfleteren. Boulder, CO: Velo Press, 2012. . About Eddy Merckx.
 Sergiology. By , Tony Le Duc, and Vanfleteren. Antwerp: Minestrone Culinaire Uitgeverij, 2012. .
En avant, marche! Over majorettes, harmonies, fanfares en andere blaasorkesten. By , Hanne Delodder, Marijke Libert; with photographs by Vanfleteren. [Lichtervelde]: Hannibal, 2012. . Accompanied by an exhibition.
The Great War 1914–18: In Flanders Fields Museum photographic collection. Veurne: Hannibal, 2013. Text in Dutch, French and English. . Photographs from the In Flanders Fields Museum, edited under the supervision of Piet Chielens and Vanfleteren.
Helden op het water. By Leo van de Ruit and Vanfleteren. [Veurne]: Hannibal, 2014. .
Facing Japan. [Veurne]: Hannibal, 2015. . In Dutch. Accompanied by an exhibition.
Book of portrait photography. Accompanied by an exhibition.
Frits Giertsberg, ed. Portraits photographiques européens depuis 1990. [Veurnes]: Hannibal, 2015. .
Frits Giertsberg, ed. European Portrait Photography since 1990. Munich: Prestel, 2015. .
The Butcher's Book. [Veurne]: Hannibal, 2015. . Text (in Dutch) by Hendrik Dierendonck, René Sépul and Marijke Libert; photography by Thomas Sweertvaegher and Vanfleteren.
Placet Hic Requiescere Musis, 1816–2016. [Veurne]: Hannibal, 2016. . Accompanied by an exhibition.
Onuitgesproken: Michel van Dousselaere. About the actor . Accompanied by an exhibition.

About Vanfleteren 
Stephan Vanfleteren. Grote Fotografen. Amsterdam: De Volkskrant. 2011. .

Notes

References

External links 
 

Belgian photojournalists
Belgian photographers
People from Kortrijk
Portrait photographers
Living people
1969 births